Fishbourne was an electoral ward of Chichester District, West Sussex, England that returned one member to sit on Chichester District Council.

Following a district boundary review, it was merged into the new Harbour Villages ward in 2019.

Councillor

Election results

References

External links
 Chichester District Council
 Election Maps

Former wards of Chichester District
Fishbourne